Orikkai is a village in Kanchipuram district, Tamil Nadu state, India.

Orikkai was known in the Tamil language as Oru Iravu Irikkai, meaning "overnight stay place", by Lord Vishnu along with two of his dedicated devotees, Thirumazhsai Alwar and Kanikannan.

The village is near the cities of Kanchipuram, Tiruvethipuram , Uthiramerur, and Chengalpattu.

Orikkai is near Kanchipuram East and Kanchipuram railway stations.

Notable places in the area include:
 Kanchi Mahaswami Satabdhi Manimantapam
 Sri Paramacharya Manimandapam

See also 
List of temples in Tamil Nadu

References 

Villages in Kanchipuram district